Rahmore, previously named as Pir Bachal Shah, Deh Kharo Kunn, is a village in  Kunri Taluka, Umarkot District, Sindh, Pakistan. It is located eastern side of Nabisar Road. It is dense populated village with majority of people relating to caste Meghwar, Syed, Saan and Kunbhar.

References

Populated places in Umerkot District